Sennori is a comune (municipality) in the Province of Sassari in the Italian region Sardinia, located about  north of Cagliari and about  northeast of Sassari.

Sennori borders the following municipalities: Osilo, Sassari, Sorso, Tergu.

Demographic evolution

References

Cities and towns in Sardinia